Bad Business may refer to:

Bad Business, 1960 BBC TV short with Timothy Bateson
Bad Business, 2004 film in Spenser (film series)
A Bad Business (Недоброе дело), from Anton Chekhov bibliography 1887 
Bad Business (novel), Spenser novel by Robert B. Parker first published in 2004
Bad Business, book by Robert Gandossy on the O.P.M. Leasing Services financial scandal
Bad Business (comic), Star Wars Tales
"Bad Business", song by Souls Of Mischief from Trilogy: Conflict, Climax, Resolution 2000
"Bad Business", song by 21 Savage from Issa Album 2017
"Bad Business", song by Grayskul from  Zenith (album)